The 1878 Boston by-election was fought on 12 August 1878.  The byelection was fought due to the resignation in order to contest Argyllshire of the incumbent Conservative MP, John Malcolm.  It was won by the Conservative candidate Thomas Garfit, who was unopposed.

References

Boston, Lincolnshire
1878 elections in the United Kingdom
1878 in England
August 1878 events
19th century in Lincolnshire
By-elections to the Parliament of the United Kingdom in Lincolnshire constituencies
Unopposed by-elections to the Parliament of the United Kingdom in English constituencies